Fernando León Boissier  (born 28 May 1966) is a Spanish sailor and Olympic champion. He competed at the 1996 Summer Olympics in Atlanta and won a gold medal in the Tornado class, together with José Luis Ballester.

He also won the Youth Sailing World Championships in 420 in 1982, and the Tornado Worlds in 1994.

In 2008 he finished third at the Snipe European Championship.

References

External links

1966 births
Living people
Olympic gold medalists for Spain
Olympic medalists in sailing
Olympic sailors of Spain
Real Club Náutico de Gran Canaria sailors
Spanish male sailors (sport)
Sailors at the 1988 Summer Olympics – 470
Sailors at the 1992 Summer Olympics – Soling
Sailors at the 1996 Summer Olympics – Tornado
Sailors at the 2000 Summer Olympics – Tornado
Snipe class sailors
Medalists at the 1996 Summer Olympics
Green Comm Racing sailors
Tornado class world champions
World champions in sailing for Spain
20th-century Spanish people